The coat of arms of South Africa is the main heraldic insignia of South Africa. The present coat of arms was introduced on Freedom Day, 27 April 2000, and was designed by Mr Iaan Bekker. It replaced the earlier national arms, which had been in use since 1910. The motto is written in the extinct |Xam, member of the Khoisan languages, and translates literally to "diverse people unite".

History
The design process was initiated in 1999, the Department of Arts, Culture, Science and Technology requested ideas for the new coat of arms from the public. A brief was then prepared based on the ideas received, along with input from the Cabinet. The Government Communication and Information System then approached Design South Africa to brief ten of the top designers. Three designers were chosen to present their concepts to the Cabinet, and Iaan Bekker's design was chosen.

The new arms were introduced on Freedom Day, 27 April 2000. The change reflected the government's aim to highlight the democratic change in South Africa and a new sense of patriotism.

The coat of arms is a series of elements organised in distinct symmetric egg-like or oval shapes placed on top of one another. The completed structure of the coat of arms combines the lower and higher oval shape in a symbol of infinity. The path that connects the lower edge of the scroll, through the lines of the tusks, with the horizon above and the sun rising at the top, forms the shape of the cosmic egg from which the secretary bird rises. In the symbolic sense, this is the implied rebirth of the spirit of the great and heroic nation of South Africa.

The coat of arms is also a central part of the Seal of the Republic, traditionally considered to be the highest emblem of the State. Absolute authority is given to every document with an impression of the Seal of the Republic on it, as this means that it has been approved by the President of South Africa. Since 1997, however, the use of the Seal of the Republic has not actually been required by the Constitution, but it continues to be used.

Boer Republics

Colonies

Bantustans

Blazon
The official blazon of the arms is:

The oval shape of foundation

The first element is the motto, in a green semicircle. Completing the semicircle are two symmetrically placed pairs of elephant tusks pointing upwards. Within the oval shape formed by the tusks are two symmetrical ears of wheat, that in turn frame a centrally placed gold shield.

The shape of the shield makes reference to the drum, and contains two human figures derived from Khoisan rock art Linton Stone, which is housed and displayed in the South African Museum in Cape Town. The figures are depicted facing one another in greeting and in unity.

Above the shield are a spear and a knobkierie, crossed in a single unit. These elements are arranged harmoniously to give focus to the shield and complete the lower oval shape of foundation.

The motto

The motto is: ǃke e꞉ ǀxarra ǁke, written in the Khoisan language of the ǀXam people, literally meaning "diverse people unite". It addresses each individual effort to harness the unity between thought and action. On a collective scale it calls for the nation to unite in a common sense of belonging and national pride – unity in diversity.

The ears of wheat
An emblem of fertility, it also symbolises the idea of germination, growth and the feasible development of any potential. It relates to the nourishment of the people and signifies the agricultural aspects of the Earth.

Elephant tusks
Elephants symbolise wisdom, strength, moderation and eternity.

The shield
It has a dual function as a vehicle for the display of identity and of spiritual defence. It contains the primary symbol of our nation.

The human figures
The figures are depicted in an attitude of greeting, symbolising unity. This also represents the beginning of the individual’s transformation into the greater sense of belonging to the nation and by extension, collective humanity.

The spear and knobkierie
 A dual symbol of defence and authority, they in turn represent the powerful legs of the secretary bird. The spear and knobkierie are lying down, symbolising peace.

The oval shape of ascendance

Immediately above the oval shape of foundation, is the visual centre of the coat of arms, a protea. The petals of the protea are rendered in a triangular pattern reminiscent of the crafts of Africa.

The secretary bird is placed above the protea and the flower forms the chest of the bird. The secretary bird stands with its wings uplifted in a regal and uprising gesture. The distinctive head feathers of the secretary bird crown a strong and vigilant head.
The rising sun above the horizon is placed between the wings of the secretary bird and completes the oval shape of ascendance.

The combination of the upper and lower oval shapes intersect to form an unbroken infinite course, and the great harmony between the basic elements result in a dynamic, elegant and thoroughly distinctive design. Yet it clearly retains the stability, gravity and immediacy that a coat of arms demands.
The King protea
The protea is an emblem of the beauty of our land and the flowering of our potential as a nation in pursuit of the African Renaissance. The protea symbolises the holistic integration of forces that grow from the Earth and are nurtured from above. The most popular colours of Africa have been assigned to the protea – green, gold, red and black.
The secretary bird
The secretary bird is characterised in flight, the natural consequence of growth and speed. It is the equivalent of the lion on Earth. A powerful bird whose legs – depicted as the spear and knobkierie – serve it well in its hunt for snakes, symbolising protection of the nation against its enemies. It is a messenger of the heavens and conducts its grace upon the Earth. In this sense it is a symbol of divine majesty. Its uplifted wings are an emblem of the ascendance of our nation, while simultaneously offering us its protection. It is depicted in gold, which clearly symbolises its association with the sun and the highest power.
The rising sun
An emblem of brightness, splendour and the supreme principle of the nature of energy. It symbolises the promise of rebirth, the active faculties of reflection, knowledge, good judgement and willpower. It is the symbol of the source of life, of light and the ultimate wholeness of humanity.

1910 arms

The first coat of arms was granted by King George V by Royal Warrant on 17 September 1910. This was a few months after the formation of the Union of South Africa.

It was a combination of symbols representing the four provinces (formerly colonies) that made up the Union. 
The first quarter is the figure of Hope, representing the Colony of the Cape of Good Hope.
The two wildebeests of the second quarter represent the Colony of Natal.
The orange tree in the third quarter was used as the symbol of the Orange Free State Republic.
The wagon in the fourth quarter represented the Transvaal.
The supporters are taken from the arms of the Orange River Colony and the Cape Colony.
The lion holds four rods, bound together, symbolising the unification of the four former colonies.

The motto,  was officially translated as "Union is Strength" until 1961, and thereafter as "Unity is Strength".

Evolution

Three official renditions of the arms were used. The original rendition (1910) was the only version used until 1930, and it continued to be used as the rank badge of warrant officers in the South African Defence Force and South African National Defence Force until 2002. The second version, painted in 1930 and known as the "ordinary coat of arms", and the third version, painted in 1932 and known as the "embellished coat of arms", were both used until 2000. The former was also used on the insignia of the South African Police until the 1990s.

Provincial arms

1910-1994
Between 1910 and 1994, South Africa was divided into four provinces, Cape Province, Natal, Orange Free State and Transvaal. These provinces had their own coat of arms.

1994present 
In April 1994, South Africa was divided into nine provinces. Each province was granted a coat of arms, in most cases designed by State Herald Frederick Brownell.

See also

South African heraldry
Coat of arms of the Orange Free State
Coat of arms of the Cape Colony
Coat of arms of Natal
Coat of arms of the Transvaal
Coat of arms of the Orange River Colony

References

External links
 National Coat of Arms | South African Government
 South Africa Heraldry History
 Past and present

South Africa
National symbols of South Africa
South African heraldry
South Africa
South Africa
South Africa
South Africa
South Africa
South Africa